Brett Domino is the alter-ego of British musician and comedian Rob J Madin. As Brett Domino, he is a musician and internet celebrity from Leeds, although Madin is actually from Chesterfield, Derbyshire. He is best known for his YouTube videos, in which he plays covers and original songs on various musical instruments, most notably the keytar. His band, The Brett Domino Trio, currently consists of only two members, Domino and "Steven Peavis" (Ste Anderson), having only been a three-piece for around a year. "Mitch Hutchinson" (Michael Denny) left the band in 2009, allegedly to become a forklift truck driver; he later returned to celebrate the band's fifth anniversary and appear on the finale of Brett Domino's Weekly YouTube Thing.

Career
The Brett Domino Trio were featured a number of times as part of BBC Radio 1's The Chris Moyles Show in 2008, and in 2009 the band appeared on ITV's Britain's Got Talent, performing live as the house band on two episodes of ITV2's sister show, Britain's Got More Talent.

Domino's YouTube videos have received over 31 million views and have been promoted by the likes of Justin Timberlake, Lady Gaga, and Ellie Goulding.

On 22 November 2010, Domino released a song called "Gillian McKeith", a humorous take on the celebrity during her time in the 10th series of the ITV show I'm a Celebrity... Get Me Out of Here!. The YouTube video gained over 1 million views in a week and entered the UK Singles Chart at number 29 on 28 November 2010.

In 2011, Madin introduced a YouTube character named "C-Bomb" — a self-proclaimed dubstep super-producer. On 14 June 2012, BBC Comedy uploaded a specially commissioned C-Bomb music video entitled "Bowl Date" to its website and YouTube channel, followed by a further music video "Mutha Nature" on 4 October 2012.

Domino appeared on Blue Peter, the BBC children's programme, on 1 March 2012, performing a comedy song detailing a shortlist for the best children's book of the last ten years. Domino continued to produce regular musical segments for the show between 2012 and 2020.

In October–November 2012, Madin was commissioned to write a number of Domino songs for the BBC programme Young Apprentice. He wrote five songs that were released weekly via the BBC's YouTube channel.

On 1 July 2013, a 20-minute sitcom pilot entitled C-Bomb was launched on BBC iPlayer and subsequently broadcast on BBC Three. The pilot was written by Madin with Jason Cook and Daniel Peak.

Domino's "How To Make A Hit Pop Song" video was nominated for the Best Internet Comedy Short award at the 2014 British Comedy Awards. Madin and Anderson attended the event as themselves.

Between 2015 and 2016, Domino was a regular guest on ITV's Weekend with Aled Jones, presenting a musical segment, often involving the other guests on the show. On 16 August 2015 he performed a medley of Shaggy songs with Shaggy himself.

The Brett Domino Trio appeared in Dictionary Corner on 8 Out of 10 Cats Does Countdown in August 2016, January 2017, January 2019, January 2020, February 2020, and February 2021.

Singles

Albums

Songs Off YouTube

Release date: 1 March 2011

Track listing:
 Beat It (2011 version)
 Justin Timberlake Medley
 I Feel for You
 We Speak No Americano
 1980s Stylophone Medley
 Bad Romance
 Jurassic Park Theme
 Ellie Goulding Medley
 Hip-Hop Medley
 Nelly Furtado Medley
 Michael Jackson Medley
 Korn / 50 Cent / Tenna Marie Medley
 Now 75 Medley
 Party In the Park (Radio Aire) Medley
 William Tell Overture (live)
 Track By Track Commentary

Reflections

Release date: 9 December 2013

Track listing:
 Gz and Hustlas (Intro)
 Earthquake
 UK Top 10 Medley (06.05.12)
 Buck Rogers
 Get Lucky
 Suit & Tie (Interlude)
 Pusher Love Girl
 Beauty and a Beat
 Sexy and I Know It
 E.T.
 Insane in the Brain
 In Paris (Interlude)
 I Been On
 212
 1D Medley
 Hey Ya!
 Holy Grail
 Tinie Tempah Medley
 Firework
 Aviation Medley
 Ministry of Sound Medley

Funk
Release date: 20 January 2017

Fan funded on Kickstarter.

Track listing:
 All Rhetoric
 NGC 4945
 Blackberry
 Fake Friends
 Interlude #1
 (In a) Funk
 Facsimile
 Fuchsia
 Magic Cane
 Shade
 Interlude #2
 Douche
 Interlude #3
 Tongue Tied

Keytar Your Heart

Release date: 12 June 2020

Track listing:
 Lunchtime Lover
 Bin Guy (A Song Containing Exclusively Three Letter Words)
 Penelope, Please Stop Recommending so Many TV Dramas
 I Think I'm in Love with the Girl Who Works on Checkout Six in Decathlon
 Bad Lips (A Song Created from a Word Cloud of Ed Sheeran Lyrics)
 Happy Birthday (to Whoever)
 Bad Bad Boy
 Get Bumpsy (An Attempt to Bring Back a Range of Obsolete Vocabulary)
 Drop Crotch Jeans (Ode to 2017)
 Pinocchio 2020

References

External links
 

English keyboardists
English multi-instrumentalists
Musicians from Leeds
Living people
1986 births